Public Interest Technology (PIT) is an approach to the use of technology to promote "the development and realization of socially responsible solutions to the challenges in a technology-driven world." It has been characterized as "people-centered problem solving." Public interest technology emerged as a field of academic research and action in higher education in 2019 with the establishment of the Public Interest Technology University Network (PIT-UN) by New America.

PIT applies technological expertise in an effort to advance the public interest and promote the public good. These goals are centered around the intentional inclusion of a collective need for justice, dignity and autonomy. PIT strives to encourage interoperability between technology, policy and society. PIT puts people at the center of policy making and improving community-driven problem-solving through the use of data and design skills. PIT aims to improve "user experience" through the assessment of practices in an "iterative manner continuously learning, improving, and aiming to deliver better outcomes to the public."

The public interest technology ecosystem requires the cultivation of partnerships with a range of organizations, advocacy groups, policy makers, academic institutions, community groups and strategic partners. Most definitions of PIT emphasize that the development of these partnerships is critical and that the growth of the PIT ecosystem needs to be one that is inclusive, equitable, diverse, accessible, ethical and effective.

History of PIT 
The field of PIT emerged out of a collaboration of educational institutions, nonprofit organizations and the investment of philanthropic entities like the Ford Foundation and the MacArthur Foundation. Freedman Consulting, a consulting firm located in Washington, D.C., found that there were clear barriers and challenges to: "the development of technology-oriented human capital in government and civil society, models of successful interventions, and recommendations for a more robust [tech talent] pipeline."

In February 2015, the NetGain Partnership brought together leaders in government, philanthropy, business, and the tech world to begin strategizing around the shared principles of building a stronger digital society focused on social change and progress. This gathering included discussions led by Ethan Zuckerman on the dangers of the World Wide Web, Emily Bell on the shifting landscape of the news media landscape, Alicia Garza on the role of technology in activism and the dangers of increased surveillance, and Sunil Abraham on the digital divide and barriers to accessing technology from a global perspective.

This led to the investment of over $18 million dollars, in 2015 in programs and initiatives aimed at a year long exploration of public interest technology. The initial grants were awarded to the Open Technology Institute of New America (known at the time as the New America Foundation),  centering open-source innovations and the development of open technology as central to the definition of PIT.  A grant provided by New America to TechCongress assisted with the creation of the TechCongress Congressional Innovation Fellowship program, which aims to promote better technology policy making and leadership - another important tenet in the definition of Public Interest Technology.

Harvard University's Data Privacy Lab, founded by Dr. Latanya Sweeney in 2001, established the Technology Science Research Collaboration Network to "engage a network of scholars and students across the country to explore and scientifically investigate the unforeseen consequences of technology." This network developed professional opportunities in public interest technology.

Professional pathways into public interest technology began with projects from Code for America. New Venture Fund's Media Democracy Fund created a university fellowship program to encourage students' interest in technology and public policy. The success of these projects set the stage for the development of the Public Interest Technology University Network in 2019.

Origin of the term 
Public interest technology (PIT) is an umbrella term used to describe an emergent discipline consisting of skilled technologists responsible for guaranteeing that all new technology is manufactured, disseminated, and enjoyed responsibly. The term "public interest technology" was chosen because it contained an allusion to "public interest law" another field that was generated through philanthropic impetus. Fashioned using a similar framework to that of public interest law, public interest technology is intended to ensure that technology is created and shared in an inclusive and accountable way that protects or improves the lives of all people.

Public interest law 
Prior to the existence of public interest law, the legal needs and advocacy for disadvantaged or vulnerable populations could only be served only through legal aid organizations like the American Civil Liberties Union (ACLU) and the National Association for the Advancement of Colored People (NAACP)’s Legal Defense and Educational Fund (LDF). The efforts of philanthropic entities like the Ford Foundation facilitated the development of field-building publications, the establishment of public interest law organizations and support for educational and professional development opportunities. The impact of these efforts led to the legal aid clinic programs at Harvard University led by law professor Jeanne Charn and at UC Berkeley School of Law legal clinics led by law professor Jeffrey Selbin as well as the founding of the Council on Legal Education for Professional Responsibility.

Science, technology, and society (STS) 
Public interest technology shares origins with the field of science, technology, and society (STS), which according to Stanford University, started before World War II and was formalized in the 1980's and combines history, anthropology, sociology, economics, ethics, and other approaches to the relations between social contexts and the practices of science and engineering. Much like STS, public interest technology uses an interdisciplinary frame to posit questions about tech designed in service of the public interest emphasizing the importance of co-design and community engagement.

Career paths in PIT 
Public interest technologists are people from a variety of disciplines who share a passion, perspective or expertise related to the conception, governance and presentation of technology. There is not currently a typical career-path for individuals interested in working in public interest, as a technologist. Public interest technologists may be, but are certainly not limited to, professionals from the following vocations: artists, designers, engineers, lawyers, lobbyists, policy makers, scientists.

PIT-related activities in other academic fields 
Using technology for the broad public interest was part of Tim Berners-Lee's original vision for the World Wide Web. He recalled "my growing realization that there was a power in arranging ideas in an unconstrained, weblike way."

A number of academic fields engage in activities that are connected to and support the goals of public interest technology, including history, science, journalism, engineering, law and government.

History 
Public history is an area in the field of history where professional and non-professional researchers seek to provide historical information to people and communities. Technology provides public historians with multiple ways to conduct and share their research. The New England Journal of History, an online publication housed at Dean College in Franklin, Massachusetts, has an entire section designed to publish the work of community members who use video cameras to record history in their backyards.

Science 
Citizen science involves efforts by everyday, non-professional community members to contribute to and support the development of scientific information in a variety of fields. Eclipse Soundscapes, a NASA-funded citizen science project, is designed to involve non-scientists in the study of how eclipses affect people and environments.

Another example of citizen science that involves using technology for the public interest: the Great Backyard Bird Count initiative, which was started in 1998, encourages volunteers to observe birds in their communities and log their findings into the eBird database, begins its 25th year today. Around 385,000 people from 192 countries participated in the four-day program in 2022, and the data is used by researchers to track bird species and direct conservation efforts.

Journalism 
Public interest journalism involves researching and reporting on issues of interest and relevance to people and communities. According to the Charitable Journalism Project, it is "journalism that serves the interests of the public." The Public Interest Journalism Initiative, established in Melbourne, Australia and in partnership with the University of Melbourne, is a news and public policy organization.

In 2023, The Center for Cooperative Media at Montclair State University, in partnership with the Rita Allen Foundation announced plans to fund cross-field civic science journalism collaborations intended to build awareness of civic science issues and potential solutions.

Engineering 
Public interest engineering is centered around the development of human and environmentally sustainable structures and system. Public interest design focuses on collaborative efforts to incorporate the public good in designing products, structures, and systems. The Code of Ethics for Engineers from the National Society of Professional Engineers states "Engineers shall at all times strive to serve the public interest."

Law 
Public interest law is rooted in the commitment that members of the legal profession have to being an advocate for all members of society, especially those who lack the financial resources to advocate for themselves in the legal and justice system. Free legal aid for those who cannot afford representation is a well-known form of public interest law in the United States.

Government 
e-Government (also known as digital government or open government) is the use of digital technologies to provide important governmental services to people and communities. The U.S. federal government has multiple initiatives involving using technology to support public interest and improved government. The United States Digital Service offers technology support to agencies of the federal government. The U.S. Digital Corps offers internships designed to help build a federal government workforce skilled in using technology to address local, state, national, and global needs. TechCongress places individuals with technology skills and backgrounds as technology policy advisers to Members of Congress. The 21st Century Integrated Digital Experience Act, passed in 2018, aims to improve how the public interacts with information on federal government websites. Open government resources are available from the federal government's Office of Personnel Management (OPM) in the Office of Inspector General.

Futurism and Public Interest Technology 
Futurism relates closely to the development of public interest technology. Public interest technology is situated at the intersection of technological development and societal impact. The development of public interest technology has benefited from the application of systems thinking models. Futurism models allow for non-linear development of solutions to complex problems, a critical public interest technology lens. As Jenny Toomey and Latanya Sweeney point out: "As technology expands its reach everywhere, to meet the challenges of our day, we need the vision of public interest tech everywhere as well, in every sector, and through the many lenses it takes, be it civic tech, community tech, tech for good." A futurism frame allows for the building of collaborations across sectors that historically have not interacted: scientists, community organizers, developers, artists, designers, writers, social theorists and activists.  As Chuck Robbins and Darren Walker state:"By fostering a new vanguard of cross-disciplinary experts to work across sectors and empowering them with the resources they need to succeed, we can bridge the gaps between the public interest and technology to power a more just and inclusive future for all."

See also 

 Citizen science
 Civic technology
 Sociotechnology
 PIT-UN

External links 

 Betterup Diversity in Tech document
 Mechanism design for social good
 Social Data Science
 Putting the Public Interest in Front of Technology (SSIR)

Further reading 

 Power to the Public: The Promise of Public Interest Technology. T.D. McGuiness & H. Schank. Princeton University Press, 2021
 The Tech that Comes Next: How Changemakers, Philanthropists, and Technologists Can Build an Equitable World. A.S. Ward & A. Bruce, Wiley & Sons, Inc., 2022. 
 Co-Designing the Future with Public Interest Technology IEEE Technology and Society Magazine 40(3):10-15 Sep, 2021
 A Civic Technologist's Practice Guide. C. Harrell. FiveSevenFive Books, 2020
 Technology and the Public Interest. H. Sun. Cambridge University Press, 2022

References 

Technology organizations
New America (organization)